Carolyn Walch Slayman (1937–2016) was an American geneticist. She was on the faculty of the Yale School of Medicine, where she was appointed Sterling Professor in 1991.

On March 11, 1937, she was born in Portland, ME and would become the first scientist in her family. In 1958, she graduated from Swarthmore College with highest honors in biology and chemistry and was elected to Phi Beta Kappa. She began graduate school at Johns Hopkins University to study biochemistry but transferred to Rockefeller University in 1959 where she was the only woman in her class. In 1963, she earned her doctorate in biochemical genetics. She was a postdoctoral fellow in membrane biochemistry at Cambridge University. After a short time stint as an assistant professor at Case Western Reserve, she joined the Yale departments of microbiology and physiology in 1967.

At Yale, she became a pioneer in genetics and a leader on campus. She helped to establish the graduate program in the Department of Human Genetics in 1972 and served as director of graduate studies in genetics from 1972 to 1984. In 1984, she was made Chair of the Department of Genetics, becoming the first woman to head a department in the medical school. Seven years later, she became on the second woman to be named a Sterling Professor. Her appointment was in the Department of Genetics. In 1995, she was appointed deputy dean for academic and scientific affairs of the Yale School of Medicine. As deputy dean, she oversaw academic and scientific affairs at the school with special attention to faculty recruitment and development in addition to the creation and advancement of research programs and core facilities. She served as deputy dean until her passing in 2016.

References

1937 births
2016 deaths
Yale Sterling Professors
American geneticists
Rockefeller University alumni
Yale School of Medicine faculty
American women geneticists
20th-century American women scientists
21st-century American women scientists
Scientists from Maine
Academics from Maine
American women academics
People from Portland, Maine
Members of the National Academy of Medicine